Sigdo Koppers (SK) is one of the most important Chilean conglomerates with  operations in the Americas, Europe and Asia-Pacific. SK activities are organized in three areas: In the Service Area are construction and industrial erection and transport and logistics business; in the Industrial Area are the rock fragmentation, household appliances, advanced technology plastic film businesses and the petrochemical sector; and in the Commercial and Automotive Area are the machinery representation, distribution and leasing and automobile representation and distribution companies.

References 

Service companies of Chile
Chilean companies established in 1960
Manufacturing companies of Chile
Companies listed on the Santiago Stock Exchange